Colman's is an English manufacturer of mustard and other sauces, formerly based and produced for 160 years at Carrow, in Norwich, Norfolk. Owned by Unilever since 1995, Colman's is one of the oldest existing food brands, famous for a limited range of products, almost all being varieties of mustard.

History
In the early 1800s, Jeremiah Colman began making mustard at a water mill near Norwich in the village of Bawburgh. To create a tangy flavour, he blended brown mustard (Brassica juncea) with white mustard (Sinapis alba).

In 1823 he took his adopted nephew, James, into the business, which became J. & J. Colman.

In 1851 J. J. Colman took over the business. By 1865 production had transferred to a large factory at Carrow Road on land at Thorpe Hamlet, bought from the Norfolk Railway to the south of Norwich, where the firm operated until the Norwich closure.

From 1855 the firm introduced its distinctive yellow packaging and bull's-head logo, and in 1866 was granted the Royal Warrant as manufacturers of mustard to Queen Victoria. His Majesty's household still uses Colman's today.

The Colman family's pioneering achievements in social welfare are part of Norwich's history. In 1857 a school was opened for the employees' children, while in 1864 the firm employed a nurse to help sick members of staff, a social revolution at the time.

From 1896 Jeremiah Colman became chairman. In 1903, the firm took over rival mustard maker Keen Robinson & Company, through which it also acquired the Robinsons barley water and baby food business. The purpose of the acquisition was to reduce competition within the mustard business.

In the 19th and early 20th centuries Wisbech uniquely held annual mustard markets where the sale of the harvest of  'brown' and 'white' seed took place. Regular annual Buyers included Messrs Colman's. 

By 1909 the company employed 2,300 people.

Keen's production was moved from London to Norwich in 1925.

Together with Reckitt, the company acquired French's, the American mustard manufacturer, in 1926 for £750,000.

In 1938 it merged with Reckitts and Sons of Hull to form the Reckitt & Colman household products conglomerate.

From 1997 to 2001, Colman's were the main sponsors of Norwich City Football Club.

The Colman's part of the business was demerged in 1995 and Colman's became part of Unilever UK Ltd. In addition to mustard, it applies its name to condiments, sauces and other foodstuffs. Reckitt and Colman engaged in cost-cutting as it prepared to sell the brand, getting rid of the agronomy department, which had looked after plant breeding and seed development.

Colman's maintains links with Norwich. The founding family are commemorated in street names such as Colman Road (part of the A140 inner ring road), on which is situated Colman's First and Middle Schools.  In addition, the Colman House residence at the University of East Anglia is named after the company and Jeremiah Colman.

Relocation
In January 2018, it was announced that Colman's was to leave its base in Norwich where the condiment had been produced for 160 years and would move its production to Burton-on-Trent and Germany.

In 2019 the Colman's factory in Norwich rolled its last jar of mustard off the production line and its "best before" date was changed for the occasion to: "Norwich's Last. By Its Finest. July 24th 2019". Colman's continued making other condiments at the Carrow site until closing its doors in early 2020.

Colman's Mustard Shop & Museum

The Mustard Shop traded in Norwich from 1973 to April 2017. The shop was originally opened in Bridewell Alley. In 1999, the shop was relocated to Norwich's art nouveau Royal Arcade. Norwich Heritage Economic & Regeneration Trust took over the shop in 2009, making it both a retail operation and tourism attraction. In 2015, Guildhall Enterprises took the premises from HEART. The shop was closed in April 2017.

Publicity
In the 1920s, Dorothy L. Sayers worked on their account. Sayers was employed by S. H. Benson; her collaboration with artist John Gilroy resulted in "The Mustard Club" for Colman's Mustard. Media slogans such as "Come on Colman's, light my fire" appeared in the late 20th century.

Product range
 Colman's English Mustard
 Colman's Condiments
 Bramley Apple Sauce
 Classic Mint Sauce
 Cranberry Sauce
 Fresh Garden Mint
 Horseradish Sauce
 Seafood Sauce
 Sweet Mint Jelly
 Tartare Sauce

See also

 List of mustard brands

References

External links

 Colman's Official Website
 The Bawburgh Mill
 The Stoke Holy Cross Mill

British condiments
Companies based in Norwich
Food and drink companies of England
Mustard brands
Unilever brands
British brands
British companies established in 1814
British Royal Warrant holders
1814 establishments in England
Food and drink companies established in 1814
Condiment companies
Colman family